Està passant (Catalan for It's happening) is a satirical news program that analyses current affairs, produced by Minoria Absoluta and broadcast in Catalonia by the public broadcaster TV3. The program mostly focuses on political news, mass media and social media in a satirical way. It is broadcast live from Monday to Thursday, and on Friday a summary of the best moments of the week is shown.

Initially, the team consisted of Toni Soler, Òscar Andreu and Jair Domínguez with occasional collaborations from Elisenda Carod. In the second season, the program added new collaborators such as Marc Giró and Alba Florejachs. At the end of October 2018, Òscar Andreu left the program to focus on a new weekly television space (La nit dels Òscars) with the collaboration of Òscar Dalmau. In the third season, Elisenda Carod takes a more main role along with Jair Domínguez, accompanying Toni Soler in the set. Since late 2019, and during 2020, the program has been acquiring new collaborators such as Lluís Jutglar Calvés (Peyu) or Magí García Vidal, in charge of the sports news section, as well as participating in the script of the program and obtaining a more important role, next to the presenters. Since 2020, Òscar Andreu has once again taken part in the set as a one-off collaborator.

Audience 

The month in which the trial of the independence leaders began, February 2019, was the one that set the best figures, with a share of 20.5%. The most watched episode was on 26 February 2019, with a percentage of 24.8% and 614,000 viewers.

See also 

 Polònia
 CCMA

References 

Catalan television programmes
Televisió de Catalunya
2017 Spanish television series debuts
2010s Spanish television series
2020s Spanish television series
Spanish comedy television series
Spanish satirical television shows